Alexander Borisovich Belyavsky (6 May 1932 – 8 September 2012) was a Soviet/Russian actor who appeared in more than one hundred films. Belyavsky was also the first presenter of the popular TV Show The 13 Chairs Tavern. In 1988 he was designated a Meritorious Artist of Russia; in 2003, he was named a People's Artist of Russia.

Biography
Alexander Belyavsky was born in Moscow, to Boris Moiseyevich Belyavsky and his wife Lyubov Alexandrovna. He was the family's eldest child, with two younger siblings. After finishing school in 1949 he enrolled into the Geological research faculty of the Moscow's Gold and Non-ferrous metals Institute where he studied up until 1955, making frequent trips to the Central Asian Soviet republics for professional practice. After the graduation Belyavsky spent several years in Irkutsk, working for the East-Siberian Geological department. He made his debut as an actor at the Irkutsk Drama Theatre, playing Molchalin in Alexander Griboyedov's Woe from Wit. Back in Moscow Belyavsky continued working as a geology engineer, occasionally taking part in amateur theatrical productions staged by The Teachers' House. He decided then to quit his regular job, enrolled into the Boris Shchukin Theatre Institute, and joined Vladimir Etush's class at the Vakhtangov Theatre. In summer 1957 Belyavsky made his debut on screen in Tales About Lenin (as a young worker Kolya). Three years later, still a student, he appeared in the Kiev Studio's film Save Our Souls (1960).

In 1961 Belyavsky graduated the Shchukin Theatre Institute with honors and was invited to join the Moscow Satire Theatre. In 1964 the Polish director Leonard Buczkowski cast him in the film Przerwany lot (Aborted Flight). While working in Warsaw Belyavsky learned the Polish language and later appeared in five more Polish films, including the popular TV wartime thriller series The Four Tankmen and a Dog (as a Soviet captain Pavlov). In 1964 he left the Satire Theatre but never severed ties with its troupe, having become the co-director (with Georgy Zelinsky) and the first presenter of the popular TV series 13 Chairs Tavern. It was Belyavsky who came up with the idea of staging a satirical TV series ridiculing a good-for-nothing 'firm' (apparently based in Poland), members of which meet at the tavern to discuss their (highly ridiculous) problems and perform Polish (later West European) pop songs in a karaoke-style.

In 1964 Belyavsky joined the Stanislavsky and Nemirovich-Danchenko Theatre, then moved in 1966 to the Theatre-Studio of a Cinema Actor. All in all he appeared in more than one hundred films (working in Poland, East Germany, North Korea, Finland, France, Chekhoslovakia, United States), one of his best-known roles being that of villainous Fox in Stanislav Govorukhin's  The Meeting Place Cannot Be Changed (1979). In the 1990s Belyavsky hosted several TV shows; he played Leonid Brezhnev in Igor Gostev's Grey Wolves (1993). In 1999 he returned to the theatre and in 2003 was awarded the title of The People's Artist of Russia.

In December 2003, Alexander Belyavsky suffered a stroke which left him incapacitated. On September 8, 2012, he was found on the ground by the house where he lived, having fallen, apparently, from the staircase window between the 5th and the 6th floor of the house he lived in. The initial police reports  implied it was suicide; later it was suggested the fall might have been accidental. Alexander Belyavsky was buried in Kuzminskoye Cemetery in Moscow.

Private life
Alexander Belyavsky was married twice. In his first marriage, to Valentina Viktorovna he fathered a son, Boris (born on March 22, 1973, drowned aged two) and daughter Nadezhda (born in 1976). With his second wife Lyudmila Tikhonovna they had a daughter, Alexandra, born on August 28, 2003, just three months prior to his suffering a stroke.
After Boris's death they have adopted another son, who committed suicide after being told by neighbors that Alexandr and Lyudmila are not his natural parents.

Selected filmography

 Stories about Lenin (Рассказы о Ленине, 1958) - electrician Nikolai
 Spasite nashi dushi (1960) - Yuriy Tsymbalyuk
 Quite seriously (Совершенно серьёзно, 1961) - journalist (segment "Inostrantsy")
 Noch bez miloserdiya (1962) - Henry Davis
 It happened in the police (Это случилось в милиции, 1963) - Lieutenant Ganin
 Yolanta (1963) - Duke Robert
 Przerwany lot (1964) - Wowa
 Going Inside a Storm (Иду на грозу, 1966) - Sergei Krylov
 Czterej pancerni i pies (Четыре танкиста и собака, 1966, TV Series) - Captain Ivan Pavlov
 Ikh znali tolko v litso (1967)
 Net i da (1967) - Stronskiy
 July Rain (1967) - Volodya
 The Mysterious Monk (Таинственный монах, 1968) - Stronski
 24-25 ne vozvrashchaetsya (1969) - Imant Herbert
 Glavnyy svidetel (1969) - Matvey Novozhilov
 Dzień oczyszczenia (1970) - partyzant Sasza
 Tsena bystrykh sekund (1971) - Oleg Vorobyov
 Talanty i poklonniki (1973) - Grigoriy Antonych Bakin
 Failure of Engineer Garin (Крах инженера Гарина, 1973, TV Mini-Series) - Vasili Shelga
  (1974) - Rzhaviy
  (1974) - Kondrashin
  (1975)
  (1975) - Prokofyev
 The Irony of Fate (Ирония судьбы, или С лёгким паром!, 1975, TV Mini-Series) - Sasha
 Ocalic miasto (1976) - Cpt. Syemyonov
 100 gramm dlya khrabrosti (1977) - Nachalnik laboratorii
 Rallijs (1978) - Man with a mouthpiece
  (1978) - Bit-Part
 Father Sergius (Отец Сергий, 1979) - master of the ferry
 Test pilota Pirxa (1979) - (uncredited)
 The Meeting Place Cannot Be Changed (Место встречи изменить нельзя, 1979, TV Mini-Series) - Yevgeniy Fox
  (1980)
 The Youth of Peter the Great (Юность Петра, 1980) - Lev Naryshkin
 At the Beginning of Glorious Days (В начале славных дел, 1980) - Lev Naryshkin
 Na Granatovykh ostrovakh (1981)
 Say a Word for the Poor Hussar (О бедном гусаре замолвите слово, 1981, TV Movie) - governor
 Anxious Sunday (Тревожное воскресенье, 1983) - Istomin
  (1984)
  (1984)
  (1985)
 One Second for a Feat (1985) - Chistyakov
 Povod (1986) - otets Kosti
 Golova Gorgony (1987)
 Tsyganka Aza (1987) - (voice)
 Proisshestviye v Utinoozyorske (1988)
 Interdevochka (1989) - (voice)
 Právo na minulost (1989)
 Entrance to the Labyrinth (Вход в лабиринт, 1989, TV Mini-Series) - Mayor of Naousen
 Private Detective, or Operation Cooperation (Частный детектив, или Операция "Кооперация", 1990) - Major Cronin
 Nevozvrashchenets (1991)
 Ocharovatelnye prisheltsy (1991)
 Promised Heaven (Небеса обетованные, 1991) - Mirov
 Tractor Drivers 2 (1992) - Nazar Duma
 Three Days in August (1992)
  (1992)
  (1993) - Leonid Ilyich Brezhnev
  (1993) - Edmund Edmontowicz
  (1993)
  (1993) - Sergey
 Marquis de Sade (1996) - Judge de Bory
 Demobbed (ДМБ, 2000) - Rear Admiral
  (2000) - Boris Ivanovich
 Przedwiosnie (2001) - Jastrun
 The Sum of All Fears (2002) - Admiral Ivanov
 Antikiller (Антикиллер, 2002) - King
  (2003) - Chlen Politbyuro #1
 Moscow Heat (Московская жара, 2004) - Vlad's grandfather
 The Irony of Fate 2 (Ирония Судьбы. Продолжение, 2007) - Dyadya Sasha
 Kiss not for the press (Поцелуй не для прессы, 2008) - governor (final film role)

References

External links
 Andrey Malakhov's Let'em Talk show on the controversy surrounding Alexander Belyavsky's death.
 

People's Artists of the RSFSR
Russian male actors
Soviet male voice actors
Soviet male film actors
1932 births
2012 deaths
Male actors from Moscow
Accidental deaths from falls